Beinn na Lap (935 m) is a mountain in the Grampian Mountains of Scotland. It lies at the northern end of Rannoch Moor, near to Corrour railway station.

A rounded mountain, the ascent from Corrour Station is quite straightforward and short, making it one of the easier Munros to climb.

References

Mountains and hills of Highland (council area)
Marilyns of Scotland
Munros